Love Dance is the fourth album led by trumpeter Woody Shaw which was recorded in 1975 and released on the Muse label. Love Dance was reissued by Mosaic Records as part of Woody Shaw: The Complete Muse Sessions in 2013.

Reception

The Allmusic site awarded this album 4 stars.

Track listing 
All compositions by Woody Shaw except as indicated
 "Love Dance" (Joe Bonner) - 12:37   
 "Obsequious" (Larry Young) - 9:28   
 "Sunbath" (Peggy Stern) - 6:33   
 "Zoltan" - 6:48   
 "Soulfully I Love You (Black Spiritual of Love)" (Billy Harper) - 8:13

Personnel 
Woody Shaw - trumpet
Steve Turre - trombone, bass trombone
René McLean - alto saxophone, soprano saxophone
Billy Harper - tenor saxophone
Joe Bonner - piano, electric piano
Cecil McBee - bass
Victor Lewis - drums
Guilherme Franco - percussion 
Tony Waters - congas

References 

Woody Shaw albums
1976 albums
Muse Records albums
Albums produced by Michael Cuscuna